Eyes of the World is a studio album by the band MacAlpine, released in 1990 through PolyGram. MacAlpine was a short-lived project by guitarist Tony MacAlpine, and the album is a departure from his previous work in that it is more commercially oriented, with none of his usual instrumental tracks in the style of neoclassical metal or piano études. According to MacAlpine himself, the project was indeed an attempt to emulate other hard rock acts at the time.

Track listing

Personnel

Tony MacAlpine – guitar, keyboard, keyboard bass, keyboard programming, drum programming, percussion, production
Alan Sehorn – lead vocals
Mark Robertson – keyboard, vocals
Mike Mani – keyboard programming, drum programming
Billy Carmassi – drums (except tracks 3, 8, 11)
Bill Zampa – drums (tracks 3, 8, 11)
Mike Jacques – bass (track 1), vocals
Randy Jackson – bass (tracks 2, 4, 9, 10)
Juan Alderete – bass (tracks 3, 5–8, 11)
Alan Lornie – violin
Maria Khodorkosky – violin
Maxine Prolman – violin
Steve Fontano – tambourine, background vocals, keyboard programming, drum programming, engineering, mixing, production
Kevin Chalfant – background vocals
Bret Douglas – background vocals
Melisa Kary – background vocals
Christina Saxton – background vocals
Davey Pattison – background vocals
Tracy Hill – spoken vocals
Neill King – engineering
Wally Buck – engineering
Jimmy Robinson – engineering
Bob Misbach – engineering
Michael Semanick – engineering
Dave Luke – engineering
Joe Marquez – engineering
Mark Rayburn – engineering
Michael Rosen – mixing

References

Tony MacAlpine albums
1990 albums
PolyGram albums